The following is a matrix of the primary country subdivisions. It shows which types of entities, e.g. province, exist in which countries and at what level. 

To keep the matrix as compact as possible and to illustrate distribution, countries are represented by ISO 3166-1 alpha-2 country code, followed by the number of units present.

Not included in the matrix are federal districts, capital districts, interstate compacts, or other special-purpose districts that exist in AR, BR, DO, MX, NG, US.

A country may have more than one entity at the same level; for example, some countries have states and territories at the first level. On the other hand, some countries may have the same entity occupy in some cases more than one level. 

* effective from 2007

Geography-related lists